Thomas Phibel (born 31 May 1986) is a Guadeloupean footballer who plays as a centre back for FC Meyrin.

Club career
Phibel spent the 2008–2009 season on loan at FC Brussels from Standard Liège. He made two Belgian First Division appearances for Standard Liège.

After having his contract with Widzew Łódź terminated, Phibel signed for Russian Premier League side Amkar Perm, before leaving them during the 2014–15 winter break. In early February 2015, FC Dynamo Moscow was considering signing him, but he failed the medical examination and the signing fell through.

On 3 June 2016, he signed a two-year contract with Serbian side Red Star Belgrade. He made his debut in an official match for Red Star on 12 July, in the first leg of the second qualifying round of the 2016–17 UEFA Champions League in a game Red Star was playing against Valletta F.C. away, he was a starter and Red Star won 2–1.

On 22 January 2017, he returned to Russia, signing with FC Anzhi Makhachkala.

In January 2018, his Anzhi contract was dissolved following his arrest in the autumn of 2017 in Belgium. The charges for his arrest were not disclosed at the time. Anzhi's director of sports Aleksandr Tantsyura declined to comment further.

In February 2019, he joined Palanga.

On 29 February 2020, FC Ararat Yerevan announced the signing of Phibel. He left the club again in July 2020.

On 31 May 2021, Phibel joined Swiss club FC Meyrin.

Personal life
Phibel hails from Les Abymes in Guadeloupe. In November 2008, he caused a deadly accident on the turnpike of Dutch city Maastricht.

References

1986 births
Living people
Guadeloupean footballers
Guadeloupean expatriate footballers
Association football defenders
RC Lens players
R.E. Virton players
Standard Liège players
R.W.D.M. Brussels F.C. players
Royal Antwerp F.C. players
Widzew Łódź players
Challenger Pro League players
Belgian Pro League players
French footballers
FC Amkar Perm players
Russian Premier League players
FC Mordovia Saransk players
FC Anzhi Makhachkala players
Red Star Belgrade footballers
FK Palanga players
FC Ararat Yerevan players
FC Meyrin players
A Lyga players
Serbian SuperLiga players
Armenian Premier League players
Guadeloupean expatriate sportspeople in Switzerland
Expatriate footballers in Belgium
Expatriate footballers in Poland
Expatriate footballers in Lithuania
Expatriate footballers in Serbia
Expatriate footballers in Armenia
Expatriate footballers in Russia
Expatriate footballers in Switzerland